Aleksandr Aleksandrovich Kondrashov (born 30 May 1984) is a former Russian football player.

Club career
He played in the Russian Football National League for FC Chernomorets Novorossiysk and FC Mordovia Saransk in 2004.

International career
He represented Russia at the 2001 UEFA European Under-16 Championship.

External links
 

1984 births
Place of birth missing (living people)
Living people
Russian footballers
Association football defenders
Russia youth international footballers
FC Chernomorets Novorossiysk players
FC Mordovia Saransk players
PFC Krylia Sovetov Samara players